Gompholobium grandiflorum, commonly known as large wedge-pea, is a species of flowering plant in the family Fabaceae and is endemic to eastern New South Wales. It is an erect, more or less glabrous shrub with trifoliate leaves and lemon-yellow and greenish, pea-like flowers.

Description

Taxonomy
Gompholobium grandiflorum was first formally described in 1804 by James Edward Smith in Exotic Botany. The specific epithet (grandiflorum) means "large-flowered" but the flowers are only large in comparison to those known to Smith at the time.

Distribution and habitat
Large wedge-pea grows in forest and heath on sandstone soils on the coast and nearby tablelands of New South Wales between Gosford and Jervis Bay and inland to the Blue Mountains.

References

grandiflorum
Mirbelioids
Fabales of Australia
Flora of New South Wales
Plants described in 1804
Taxa named by James Edward Smith